Terrence Lee Gardner (born  January 16, 1975) is an American former Major League Baseball pitcher. Gardner spent the  season with the Toledo Mud Hens, the Triple-A affiliate of the Detroit Tigers. He split the  season between the Triple-A Albuquerque Isotopes and the Marlins. Gardner pitched in 62 games with the Marlins in 2007, going 3–4 with a 1.94 ERA. He retired after the  season.

External links

Lee Gardner at Pura Pelota (Venezuelan Professional Baseball League)

1975 births
Living people
Albuquerque Isotopes players
Baseball players from Michigan
Central Michigan Chippewas baseball players
Central Michigan University alumni
Charleston RiverDogs players
Durham Bulls players
Florida Marlins players
Fresno Grizzlies players
Major League Baseball pitchers
Naranjeros de Hermosillo players
American expatriate baseball players in Mexico
Orlando Rays players
People from Livingston County, Michigan
Sportspeople from Metro Detroit
St. Petersburg Devil Rays players
Tampa Bay Devil Rays players
Tiburones de La Guaira players
American expatriate baseball players in Venezuela
Toledo Mud Hens players